Žužnje is a village in the municipality of Mavrovo and Rostuša, North Macedonia.

Culture 
Žužnje, a village of Upper Reka  became renown for its handicrafts and traditional women's costumes that used silver beads and filigree making them some of the most picturesque in the region.

Demographics
According to the 2002 census, the village had a total of 8 inhabitants. Ethnic groups in the village include:

Albanians 8

References

Villages in Mavrovo and Rostuša Municipality
Albanian communities in North Macedonia